Nepanagar railway station is a small railway station in Burhanpur district, Madhya Pradesh. Its code is NPNR. It serves Nepanagar town. The station consists of two platforms, neither of which is well sheltered. It lacks many facilities including water and sanitation.

Only single express that stops at Nepanagar is :
(as of December 2020 )

 Kushinagar Express

References

Railway stations in Burhanpur district
Bhusawal railway division